James McDonald (born 11 April 1964) is an Irish racewalker. He competed in the men's 20 kilometres walk at the 1988, 1992 and the 1996 Summer Olympics.

References

1964 births
Living people
Athletes (track and field) at the 1988 Summer Olympics
Athletes (track and field) at the 1992 Summer Olympics
Athletes (track and field) at the 1996 Summer Olympics
Irish male racewalkers
Olympic athletes of Ireland
Place of birth missing (living people)